Gelal (also Romanized as Gelāl) is a village in Howli Rural District, in the Central District of Paveh County, Kermanshah Province, Iran. At the 2006 census, its population was 728, in 164 families.

References 

Populated places in Paveh County